Oxelösunds IK is a Swedish association football club located in Oxelösund in Södermanland County.

Background
Oxelösunds Idrottsklubb is a Swedish sports club founded on 10 January 1984 following the merger of IFK Oxelösund and Oxelösunds SK. The club competes in football. The bandy section was cancelled due to the city deciding to build a new football field instead of repairing the broken bandy field. Bandy was previously the city's most successful sport, the team played in Division 2.  Kalle Spjuth now of Hammarby IF and Markus Hillukkala of Bollnäs GIF are two of their most famous past players, they were both youth products of the club.

Since their foundation Oxelösunds IK has participated mainly in the middle and lower divisions of the Swedish football league system. The club currently plays in Division 5 Södermanland Gul which is the seventh tier of Swedish football. They play their home matches at Ramdalens IP in Oxelösund.

Oxelösunds IK are affiliated to the Södermanlands Fotbollförbund.

Season to season

Attendances

In recent seasons Oxelösunds IK have had the following average attendances:

Footnotes

External links
 Oxelösunds IK – Official website

Football clubs in Södermanland County
Bandy clubs in Sweden
Association football clubs established in 1984
Bandy clubs established in 1984
Sport in Södermanland County
1984 establishments in Sweden